The Sakhalin-3 project is an oil and gas development in Sakhalin Island, Russia.

The Veninsky field is being developed by Venineft, a joint venture of Rosneft (74.9%) and Sinopec (25.1%).

Kirinsky gas and condensate field is being developed by Gazprom Dobycha Shelf, a subsidiary of Gazprom. The field is expected to be commissioned in 2014. In addition, Gazprom owns the East-Odoptu and Ayashsky licences.

Chevron Corporation, ExxonMobil, and Rosneft got the licence to operate Sakhalin-3 under a production sharing agreement granted in 1993. The licence was revoked and re-tendered in 2005 under a normal tax regime.

In June 2009, Prime Minister of Russia Vladimir Putin invited Royal Dutch Shell to participate in the Sakhalin-3 project.

See also

 Sakhalin-I
 Sakhalin-II

References

Natural gas fields in Russia
Oil fields of Russia
Sakhalin
Gazprom oil and gas fields
Rosneft oil and gas fields
Sinopec